Vahram Manavian (Born Constantinople, Ottoman Turkey 1880 – died Cairo, Egypt 1952) was an Ottoman and Egyptian painter of Armenian descent.

Life 
Vahram Manavian was born in Istanbul, one of six children of the writer Dikran Manavian. He began taking art lessons from the painter Simon Agopyan and later graduated the academy of Fine Arts. He went to Paris, France where he took lessons at the Académie Julian. He emigrated with his family to Egypt in 1911 and settled in Alexandria. He became an art teacher and later set up a business for financial reasons, as well as working as a photographer. Meanwhile, he continued to paint. He moved to Cairo and in 1934 opened a joint exhibition with the painter Yervant Demirciyan. His second exhibition was held at the Museum of Fine Arts in 1951. He died in Cairo. His paintings are still being exhibited throughout the world.

Publication 
 Egyptian Humour, 1916 - Caricatures and cartoons

References 

1880 births
1952 deaths
Artists from Istanbul
20th-century painters from the Ottoman Empire
20th-century Armenian painters
20th-century Egyptian painters
20th-century Egyptian educators
Egyptian cartoonists
Academy of Fine Arts in Istanbul alumni
Académie Julian alumni
Armenians from the Ottoman Empire
Egyptian people of Armenian descent
Emigrants from the Ottoman Empire to Egypt